Austin Stowell (born December 24, 1984) is an American actor. He is known for his roles in Dolphin Tale, its sequel Dolphin Tale 2, Love and Honor (2013), Whiplash (2014), and as Francis Gary Powers in Steven Spielberg's Bridge of Spies (2015).

Early life
Stowell was born as youngest of three boys in Kensington, Connecticut, where he was raised by his father, Robert, a retired steelworker, and his mother, Elizabeth, a schoolteacher.

He graduated from Berlin High School in 2003 with the intention of pursuing a professional career in acting. Upon acceptance at the University of Connecticut in Storrs, Connecticut, he studied with the Department of Dramatic Arts, a division of the School of Fine Arts. He performed in several productions with the Connecticut Repertory Theatre, including Julius Caesar, It Can't Happen Here, and As You Like It.

Stowell graduated with a Bachelor of Fine Arts in 2007.

Career
In 2019, Stowell portrayed Nately in Catch-22, a Hulu miniseries based on the novel of the same name; the series premiered on May 17.

Filmography

Film

Television

References

External links
 

1984 births
21st-century American male actors
American male film actors
American male television actors
Living people
Male actors from Connecticut
People from Kensington, Connecticut
University of Connecticut alumni